Záboří is a municipality and village in České Budějovice District in the South Bohemian Region of the Czech Republic. It has about 400 inhabitants. The historic centre of the village with the folk Baroque architecture is well preserved and is protected by law as a village monument reservation. The village of Dobčice is protected as a village monument zone.

Administrative parts
Villages of Dobčice and Lipanovice are administrative parts of Záboří.

References

Villages in České Budějovice District